Christopher James Rowe OBE (born 1944) is a British classical scholar. He is Professor Emeritus in the Department of Classics and Ancient History of Durham University, England, where he was Head of Department 2004–2008.  He is a former  President of the Classical Association, and was appointed OBE in 2009 for "services to scholarship".

Thought on Plato
Rowe translated into English and gave an innovative interpretation of the Aristotle's Nicomachean Ethics and the Plato's dialogues Theaetetus and Sophist.

He compared the ideal-real relation existing among the Republic and the Theaetetus for what concerns the epistemology, and then he established an analogy with the political ideal of the Republic and its real actualization described in the Statesman and in the Laws. In the volume Plato and the Art of Philosophical Writing, Rowe argued that "Plato remains throughout essentially a Socratic".

Selected publications
 Plato, Republic (new translation, with introduction and notes)  Penguin, 2012,    
 The Last Days of Socrates  Penguin, 2010,  
Plato and the Art of Philosophical Writing   Cambridge University Press, 2007, 
 with Terry Penner  Plato's Lysis  Cambridge University Press, 2005

References

Living people
British classical scholars
Classical scholars of the University of Durham
British scholars of ancient Greek philosophy
Officers of the Order of the British Empire
Greek–English translators
Presidents of the Classical Association
1944 births